Events from the year 1494 in Ireland.

Incumbent
Lord: Henry VII

Events
September 13 – Henry Deane appointed Lord Chancellor of Ireland under Edward Poynings
October 13 – Edward Poynings arrives at Howth with 1,000 men. 
December 1 – Edward Poynings assembles the Parliament of Ireland in Drogheda to tell it that it is thereafter to be placed under the authority of the Privy Council of England by Poynings' Law (1495).
Hugh Conway was created Lord Treasurer of Ireland by King Henry VII of England

Births

Deaths

References

 
1490s in Ireland
Ireland
Years of the 15th century in Ireland